Spirit Warriors is a BBC children's adventure series, broadcast on BBC Two, BBC HD and CBBC. It is the first British television drama series to have a predominantly East Asian cast.

Very loosely inspired by ancient Chinese myths and legends, the show follows Bo, her sister Jen, and fellow schoolchildren Vicky, Trix and Martin who, during a trip to a museum, are transported to a parallel spirit world. Once there, they find themselves transformed into Spirit Warriors, each with his or her own special spirit power. With the help of their mentor Shen, a dragon, they have to use their new-found skills to navigate the realms of Wood, Water, Earth and Fire and find twelve legendary spirit pieces before the evil warlord Li and his henchman Hwang can get their hands on them.

The series was created and written by Jo Ho and produced by Nick Pitt. The working title was Bo and the Spirit World. Jon East, who had previously won a BAFTA for the children's docu-drama That Summer Day, was the executive producer, and directed half of the episodes including the start and end of the series. Episodes 4 to 8 were directed by the Australian director Mat King.

The show has been picked up internationally by Norway, South Korea, New Zealand and Singapore.

Cast 
The BBC initially sought two young British Chinese or other East Asian actors to play Bo and her brother Timothy, characters aged 13 and 11. The role of Timothy was later changed to female, and it was announced in June 2009 that 16-year-old Jessica Henwick had been cast as Bo. Within the next month, announcements were made about the rest of the cast, including Alicia Lai in the role of the younger sister Jen.

 Bo played by Jessica Henwick
 Shen voiced by Burt Kwouk
 Jen played by Alicia Lai
 Vicky played by Little Simz
 Trix played by Gilles Geary
 Martin played by Karl Rogers
 Li played by Benedict Wong
 Hwang played by Tom Wu
 Fei-Yan played by Daphne Cheung
 Ding-Xiang played by David Yip
 Qi-Shi played by Andy Cheung

Episodes
The first episode premiered on the CBBC channel on Friday 22 January 2010 at 5:45pm, titled "A Warrior is Born".

Following the transmission of the final episode, a backstage documentary exclusive called Spirit Warriors: Backstage aired on 26 March, which included cast interviews and footage from behind the scenes.

Production 
The series was filmed over three months at Three Mills Studios from April 2009. The designer, Catrin Meredydd, procured various set elements from recently completed feature films.

As preparation for her role, Jessica Henwick took wushu training with the series fight choreographer Jude Poyer, a Hong Kong fight director and stunt man who has worked on Asian and American action films with Jet Li and other stars.

The main title track was composed by Matt Dunkley, and the series' costume design was handled by Richard Cooke.

Press 
Spirit Warriors was featured in the February issue of Combat magazine, Broadcast magazine, Young Performer magazine, Girl Talk and Top of the Pops magazine among others.

Reception 
Creator and writer Jo Ho was nominated for 'Best Breakthrough Talent' at the Cultural Diversity Network Awards 2010. Ho also won the Women in Film and Television's 'New Talent Award'. 
In November 2010 it was announced that the show also received a nomination for 'Best Children's Programme' at the 2011 Broadcast Awards.

 From the Chinese Community website "Dimsum"'s review of the first episode:
"Finally there are Chinese faces on TV – yes we do exist o world! I feel like holding a party to celebrate. Watching Spirit Warriors is like finally meeting a friend who's ten years late for a party – you're disappointed that they've taken so long but once here you can't help smiling. For truth be told a drama starring East Asian actors as the leads has been long overdue... the BBC have obviously pushed the boat out and got fully behind this series which is great to see."

 From the "Observer" review of the first episode:
"...clever new fantasy drama for children which includes "Crouching Tiger"-style martial arts with CGI characters and live action"

References

External links 
 
 

2010 British television series debuts
2010 British television series endings
2010s British children's television series
Martial arts television series
BBC high definition shows
BBC children's television shows
Chinese mythology in popular culture
British children's fantasy television series
English-language television shows